The sugarcane termite (Odontotermes assmuthi) is a species of termite of the genus Odontotermes. It is native to India and Sri Lanka. It is recorded from coconut palms and is a pest of sugarcane.

Description
General body color is creamy with darker head. Workers can be seen foraging in both morning and evening.

It is a major pest of sugar cane, where attacked canes can be wilted and then dieback occurs. Semi-circular feeding marks on the leaves are characteristic marks left by the termite. Aspergillus flavus known to have termiticidal activity against O. assmuthi.

References

External links
 
 
 
 
 
 
 

Termites
Insects described in 1913
Insects of Sri Lanka